Mohamed Bin Mubarak Al-Khulaifi (born 1946) is a Qatari diplomat and the former chairman of Consultative Assembly of Qatar. 

Al-Khulaifi served as the ambassador to Kuwait 1972-1981, and ambassador at the ministry of foreign affairs 1981-1991. In 1990, he was appointed to the consultative assembly, and elected as the chairman in 1995. He served until 2017.

References

1946 births
Living people
Qatari politicians
Ambassadors of Qatar
Chairmen of Consultative Assembly of Qatar